Emelyne Ann-Emmanuelle Laurent (born 4 November 1998) is a French professional footballer who plays as a forward for German club Bayern Munich and the France national team.

Club career
At club level, Laurent has played for Montpellier, Bordeaux and Lyon. In January 2019, Laurent was loaned to En Avant de Guingamp for the remainder of the season. Later in 2019, she was loaned to Bordeaux. In August 2020, she was loaned to Atlético Madrid for the season. She scored for Atlético in their 2020–21 UEFA Women's Champions League round of 16 second leg match against Chelsea. Atlético drew the match 1–1, but lost 3–1 on aggregate. In May 2022, Laurent signed for German club Bayern Munich on a three-year contract.

International career
Laurent was France U-19's joint top goal scorer at the 2017 UEFA Women's Under-19 Championship, with three goals. She represented France U-20 in the 2018 FIFA U-20 Women's World Cup. In the opening match against Ghana U-20, she scored two goals, as France won 4–1. She scored 4 goals in the tournament, as France finished fourth.

Aged 19, Laurent made her senior team debut, coming on as a substitute in a friendly against Australia. In May 2019, Laurent was selected for the 2019 FIFA Women's World Cup in France. At the time, she had made three appearances for France. In 2021, she scored two goals in a match for France under-23s against Sweden under-23s.

Personal life
Laurent is from Fort-de-France, Martinique. Aged 11, she started playing football for AS Samaritaine U-13. Laurent moved to Metropolitan France at the age of 14.

Career statistics

International

International goals

References

External links
 
 
 

1998 births
Living people
Sportspeople from Fort-de-France
French women's footballers
Martiniquais women's footballers
Women's association football forwards
Division 1 Féminine players
Montpellier HSC (women) players
FC Girondins de Bordeaux (women) players
Olympique Lyonnais Féminin players
En Avant Guingamp (women) players
France women's youth international footballers
France women's international footballers
2019 FIFA Women's World Cup players
French people of Martiniquais descent
Black French sportspeople
French expatriate sportspeople in Spain
French expatriate sportspeople in Germany
FC Bayern Munich (women) players
French expatriate women's footballers
Expatriate women's footballers in Germany
Expatriate women's footballers in Spain